Teona Sukhashvili (born February 6, 1994) is a Georgian football goalkeeper, who plays for Sivasspor in the Turkish Women's Super League, and  the Georgian national team.

Playing career

Club
Sukhashvili moved to Turkey and joined Kdz. Ereğlispor to play in the Turkish Women's First Football League in November 2016. She capped in 24 matches in three seasons.

By October 2019, she transferred to the Istanbul-based club Fatih Vatan Spor.

She joined the newly established club Sivasspor to play in the 2021-22 Turkcell Super League.

International
Sukhashvili was admitted to the Georgia women's national football team and took part at three matches of the 2019 FIFA Women's World Cup qualification – UEFA preliminary round Group 1 at Tbilisi, Georgia in April 2017.

Career statistics
.

References

External links

Living people
1994 births
People from Kakheti
Women's association football goalkeepers
Women's footballers from Georgia (country)
Georgia (country) women's international footballers
Expatriate women's footballers from Georgia (country)
Expatriate women's footballers in Turkey
Karadeniz Ereğlispor players
Fatih Vatan Spor players
Sivasspor (women's football) players
Turkish Women's Football Super League players
Expatriate sportspeople from Georgia (country) in Turkey